The Kara Kara National Park is a national park located in the Wimmera/Goldfields region of Victoria, Australia.

Features
Kara Kara National Park protects one of the most intact remnants of Victoria's box-ironbark forests. Parts of the national park are relatively unmodified in comparison to other areas of forest in the central goldfields and are a fine example of the type of vegetation that once covered almost 13% of Victoria. The national park is of importance to the Dja Dja Wurrung people.

Most of the national park lies within the Northern Grampians Shire and the southern part of the national park is within the Pyrenees Shire.

The national park lies within the St Arnaud Box-Ironbark Region Important Bird Area, identified as such by BirdLife International because of its importance for swift parrots and other woodland birds.

The national park has numerous tracks of varying grades and quality for mountain biking and hiking with easy access off Sunraysia Highway between Redbank and St Arnaud.

See also

 Protected areas of Victoria
 List of reduplicated Australian place names
 Parks Victoria

References

National parks of Victoria (Australia)
Protected areas established in 2002
Wimmera
2002 establishments in Australia